Ben Jeby (born Benjamin Morris Jebaltowsky, in 1909), was an American world champion middleweight boxer from the Lower East Side of New York City.  He was managed by the legendary Hymie Caplin.

Early life and career
Jeby was born on December 27, 1909, near Clinton and Delancey Streets in New York's teaming Lower East side to Jewish parents.

He turned professional in 1927, at the age of 19.

He defeated Joey LaGrey in an eight-round points decision on August 19, 1930, in at Queensboro Stadium in Long Island.  Harry Ebbets fell to Jeby in a ten-round points decision at Madison Square Garden on November 14, 1930.  There were no knockdowns in the bout.

He drew in ten rounds with Dave Shade, the division's number one contender, on September 8, 1931, at Queensboro Stadium.  In the close bout, Jeby had an edge in the third, fourth, and final three rounds.  The following month he lost to Shade in a twelve-round unanimous decision at New York's Madison Square Garden.

Jeby would become one of several Jewish title-holders of the time.  On March 20, 1931, weighing 157.5 pounds, he defeated Len Harvey on points over 12 rounds in a unanimous decision at Madison Square Garden in New York City.  Jeby fought a rushing, mauling, body punching battle, at close range, for which Harvey had no answer.  His attempts to clinch were inadequate to stop the onrush of Jeby.

My Sullivan fell to Jeby from a technical knockout in the ninth at Chicago Stadium before a crowd of 11,000 on February 26, 1932.  Sullivan had built a substantial lead in the early rounds, but Jeby got to him with both hands in the later rounds, finally leaving him helpless on the ropes in the ninth.

He had a difficult loss to Frank Battaglia in a first-round knockout at Chicago Stadium on March 18, 1932. The knockout loss, which came 1:30 into the first round, discouraged Jeby, but ultimately did not affect his plans to pursue the World Middleweight title.  The two would meet again.

Chick Devlin fell soundly to Jeby in a fifteen-round points decision at New York's St. Nicholas Arena on November 21, 1932.  The fifteen-round decision for Jeby upheld his contention hopes for the Middleweight title.

NYSAC World Middle champion
From 1932-33, Jeby was the New York Boxing Commission Middleweight Champion of the World.  Jeby defeated Canadian Frankie Battaglia, viewed as one of the world's best middleweights, by TKO at Madison Square Garden in a title fight on January 13, 1933.  In the twelfth round, referee Jack Britton stopped the fighting due to a cut on Battaglia's eye.  The injury was caused by a left hook from Jeby in the third round.  Battaglia was down for a count of nine in the second.

He defeated Paul Pirrone on January 30, 1933, in a sixth-round technical knockout in Cleveland.  The quarterfinal match was for the NYSAC's World Middleweight Tournament.  A crowd of 8,400 saw Jeby drop Pirrone seven times before the bout was stopped in the sixth.

Jeby fought Vince Dundee to a draw over 15 rounds, keeping his title, at Madison Square Garden on March 17, 1933.  The crowd of 11,000 felt strongly that Dundee had won the bout and reacted with derision to the draw ruling.  Jeby, who had twice previously lost to Dundee, looked far worse than his opponent at the end of the bout.

Young Terry fell to Jeby in an NYSAC Middleweight Title bout at Dreamland Park in New Jersey in a fifteen-round points decision on July 10, 1933.  Terry mounted a bristling two-fisted attack in the final two rounds that had many in the crowd of 12,052  unhappy with the final decision for Jeby.  Jeby won six, Terry five, and four were even.

Loss of World middle title, August, 1933
On August 9, 1933, he was knocked out by Lou Brouillard in the seventh round of a scheduled 15-round title fight at the Polo Grounds, surrendering his NYSAC World Middleweight title.   Although only twenty-five at the time, Jeby's career began to falter after the loss of his title.

On April 6, 1934, he lost to Teddy Yarosz in a twelve-round points decision in Pittsburgh.  The bout was a title match for the Pennsylvania version of the World Middleweight Title. Yarosz's powerful right continually assaulted Jeby with devastating results, but Jeby managed to hold off a knockout.  The Pittsburgh Press credited Yarosz with nine rounds, with only one to Jeby.

In 73 bouts, he was 54-14 with 22 knockouts.

Life after boxing
After he retired from the ring, Jeby obtained a plumber's license and worked in that field the rest of his life.  He died on October 5, 1985, in New York, and was survived by wife Evelyn Siedman, a former chorus line dancer.

Professional boxing record

See also
List of select Jewish boxers

References

External links
Jews in Sports bio
 

1909 births
1985 deaths
Boxers from New York City
Middleweight boxers
Jewish American boxers
Jewish boxers
World middleweight boxing champions
World boxing champions
American male boxers
20th-century American Jews